Francisco Mendoza de Bobadilla (25 September 1508 – 1 December 1566) was a Spanish Roman Catholic Cardinal.

Biography
He was born in Cuenca, the son of Diego Hurtado de Mendoza, first marquis of Cañete and Viceroy of Navarre during the reign of King Charles V. He studied in the universities of Alcalá de Henares and Salamanca, and subsequently taught at Salamanca, Évora and Coimbra.

In 1533 Francisco Mendoza de Bobadilla was elected bishop of Coria on with dispensation for not having yet reached the canonical age of 27.

He was created cardinal priest on the consistory of 19 December 1544 by Pope Paul III and opted to the title of Santa Maria in Aracoeli. He participated in the Papal conclave of 1549–1550. The new Pope Julius III opted him for the title of S. Eusebio (1550) and promoted him to the Diocese of Burgos, Spain on 27 June 1550.

He resided in the Spanish court for a long time and he had been sent by King Philip II of Spain in different missions. Francisco Mendoza de Bobadilla died in 1566 in Arcos de la Llana, near Burgos.

Footnotes

External links
The Cardinals of the Holy Roman Church-Biographical Dictionary
Catholic hierarchy data

1508 births
1566 deaths
16th-century Roman Catholic archbishops in Spain
Archbishops of Burgos
16th-century Spanish cardinals
People from Cuenca, Spain
University of Salamanca alumni
Academic staff of the University of Salamanca
16th-century Spanish Roman Catholic theologians